Louis Schmeisser (5 February 1848, Zöllnitz – 23 March 1917) was one of the best-known weapon technical designers of Europe. He is associated with the development and production of the Bergmann machine guns used during the First World War. He designed the Dreyse 1907 Pistol which was used in both World Wars.

Schmeisser was born in Zöllnitz, Saxe-Altenburg. He was the father of Hugo Schmeisser (1884–1953), who was also a famous designer of infantry weapons, including the StG 44. His other son, Hans Schmeisser, was also a well-known weaponry designer.

References 

 Norbert Moczarski, Zwischen Jena, Gaggenau, Suhl und Sömmerda - Leben und Wirken des Waffenkonstrukteurs Louis Schmeisser (1848–1917) In: Sömmerdaer Heimatheft. Beiträge zur Heimatkunde des Landkreises Sömmerda und der Unstrut-Finne-Region, Sömmerda 2000, pp. 82–93.
 http://www.kalashnikov.ru/upload/medialibrary/954/10_18.pdf

1848 births
1917 deaths
People from Saale-Holzland-Kreis
People from Saxe-Altenburg
Firearm designers
19th-century German inventors